Arturo (1985  July 3, 2016) was a polar bear living in Mendoza Zoological Park in Mendoza, Argentina, the only polar bear living in the country. He was born in the United States and transferred to Argentina in 1993. His companion, a female named Pelusa, died of cancer in 2012. Animal rights activists had, in response, dubbed Arturo the "world's saddest animal" and promoted a petition to have him moved to Assiniboine Park Zoo, a zoo in Winnipeg, Manitoba, Canada. The petition was created by Laura Morales of Hamilton, Ontario. It gained considerable attention after the hashtag #Freearturo began trending on Twitter. Supporters of the petition also noted that a polar bear died in Buenos Aires in December 2012 due to excessive heat, and argued that Arturo exhibited symptoms of depression and other mental health problems.

As of July 19, 2014, the petition had over 400,000 signatures, and had been endorsed by Newt Gingrich and Cher. Assiniboine Park Zoo responded that while they would have gladly accepted Arturo there, they did not have the authority to do so unless Argentina agreed to transfer him there, and that the Mendoza zoo could not supply the necessary medical records to make such a trip possible.

On July 24, 2014, the director of the Mendoza Zoo, Gustavo Pronotto, told the Associated Press that Arturo was too old to be moved to Canada. In social media, people also advocated for Arturo to be moved to Canada. and Twitter hashtag #FreeArturo.

Arturo died on July 3, 2016, aged 30–31, despite polar bears rarely living beyond 25.

See also
 List of individual bears

References 

2016 animal deaths
Individual polar bears
2014 in Argentina
Individual animals in Argentina